Unwritten Law is an American punk rock band formed in 1990 in Poway, California. They have released seven full-length studio albums and have toured internationally, including performances on the Warped Tour. They are notable for their singles "Seein' Red" and "Save Me (Wake Up Call)," both of which entered the top 5 in the US Modern Rock charts. Their latest studio album, The Hum, was released in 2022.

History

Formation and early years (1990–1996)
Unwritten Law was formed in Poway, California in 1990. Original drummer Wade Youman generally takes credit for starting the band. The band was founded by Youman, vocalist Chris Mussey, guitarist Matt Rathje, and bassist Craig Winters. A number of players came and went before the lineup coalesced to include Scott Russo on vocals, Steve Morris and Rob Brewer on guitar, and Jeff Brehm on bass. They released their first cassette demo on September 9, 1992, known as Six Song Demo. The lineup changed once again, and they released the 7" vinyl single Blurr in 1993. The band quickly established themselves in the prolific San Diego music scene of the early 1990s that also included groups such as Blink-182, Agent 51, Buck-O-Nine, Sprung Monkey, One by One, Drive Like Jehu, and Rocket from the Crypt.

In 1994 the band recorded their first album, Blue Room, which was released by local label Red Eye Records. It established their early sound of fast-paced punk rock and gave them the opportunity to build their reputation by playing local shows in and around the San Diego area. Songs such as "CPK," "Shallow," and "Suzanne" would become favorites with local fans and would remain in their live set for years to come.

Major label signing (1996–1999)
Blue Room attracted the attention of Epic Records, who signed the band to a recording contract. Their second album, Oz Factor, was released in 1996. The songs "Denied" and "Superman" received airplay on several southern California rock radio stations and were released as singles. Over the next year the band toured the United States with bands such as Blink-182 and Pennywise.

By 1997 Unwritten Law had signed to Interscope Records and bassist John Bell had left the band. Pivit bassist Micah Albao joined them in Seattle for the recording of their self-titled album Unwritten Law which was released in 1998. The singles "Lonesome," "Cailin," and "Teenage Suicide" became minor hits on rock radio stations. Pat "PK" Kim, formerly of Sprung Monkey, joined as their new permanent bass player and the band embarked on the Vans Warped Tour, which took them across North America, Europe, and Australia. In Australia the band developed an enthusiastic and dedicated following, and they would return there over the next few years and release several singles and live recordings exclusive to the country.

Elva, Here's to the Mourning (2000–2005)
The band spent a considerable amount of time recording and preparing their next release, 2002's Elva. The album was a stylistic change of pace, deliberately moving away from their established punk rock formula and towards a more accessible hard rock sound. The lead single "Up All Night" became somewhat popular, but it was "Seein' Red" and its accompanying music video which brought the band their greatest success, reaching No. 1 on US modern rock charts. They toured extensively in support of the album alongside bands such as Sum 41 and The Used.

In 2003 the band was invited by VH1 to film an episode of the live acoustic series Music in High Places. The invitation happened somewhat by accident, as the station was hoping to attract Jimmy Eat World but contacted Unwritten Law's management by mistake. The band recorded a set of acoustic performances in various locales at Yellowstone National Park. They prepared the recordings for release as an album, but Interscope declined to release it. The band ended their contract with Interscope and signed to Lava Records, who released Music in High Places as an album. The performance was also released as a DVD entitled Live in Yellowstone. The song "Rest of My Life" from this performance received airplay on modern rock radio stations nationwide. The band's song Celebration Song was featured in the soundtracks of Need For Speed: Underground 2 and MX vs ATV Unleashed.

Shortly after the release of Music in High Places founding drummer Wade Youman was ejected from the band due to personal and professional issues. Wade later went on to Join The Rattlesnake Aces. For the recording of their next album Here's to the Mourning drummers Adrian Young of No Doubt and Tony Palermo of Pulley joined the band in the studio. The band got along so well with Palermo that by the time of the album's release in 2005 he had joined as their permanent drummer. Much of the lyrics on the album were co-written by singer Scott Russo's girlfriend Aimee Allen, with whom he formed the side project Scott & Aimee. Allen and Linda Perry contributed to the writing of the album's lead single "Save Me (Wake Up Call)," which reached No. 5 on US modern rock charts. This was followed by the single "She Says."

In March 2005 guitarist Rob Brewer was fired from Unwritten Law after a physical altercation on stage with Russo. Russo and other band members collectively decided to remove Brewer from the band. The band chose not to replace him and continued on as a 4-piece. They continued to tour in support of Here's to the Mourning across the United States as well as internationally.

Best of Compilation, Live and Lawless and Swan (2006–2012) 
Unwritten Law spent much of 2006 recording a "best of" album entitled The Hit List, which was released on January 2, 2007 by Abydos Records. It includes 17 of the band's most popular songs, most of which were re-recorded by the current lineup, as well as 2 new songs including lead single "Shoulda Known Better." Interscope also released a "best of" compilation entitled 20th Century Masters: The Millennium Collection which includes songs from the albums Unwritten Law and Elva. On January 3, 2007 the band performed "Shoulda Known Better" on The Tonight Show with Jay Leno. That July the band embarked on a North American tour in support of The Hit List, with Scott & Aimee drummer Dylan Howard filling in for roughly half the tour while Palermo stayed home with his wife, who was due to give birth.

Also during 2007, Palermo acted as fill-in touring drummer for Papa Roach. In March 2008 it was announced that Palermo had joined Papa Roach permanently. Meanwhile, Unwritten Law, with new drummer Dylan Howard, filmed a live DVD at the Key Club in Hollywood, California in March 2008. The album, titled Live and Lawless, was released September 30, 2008 through Suburban Noize Records. Unwritten Law's sixth studio album, Swan, was also released through Suburban Noize on March 29, 2011.  On January 24, 2011, Unwritten Law posted on their Myspace page the first single from their new album called "Starships and Apocalypse."  They have also been confirmed to play the 2011 Warped Tour.

Guitarist Steve Morris and bassist Pat Kim left Unwritten Law at the end of their Swan Tour in 2011 due to a physical altercation between Scott Russo and Morris.  This was kept silent for a few months until after the band finished touring with Warped Tour, although Morris and Kim did not tour with them.  Derik Envy, formerly of Red Light Sky, and Kevin Besignano, formerly of Bullets and Octane, had become the permanent replacements for Kim and Morris, respectively.

Lineup changes, Acoustic (2013–2021)
In 2013, founding drummer, Wade Youman, returned to Unwritten Law, after a reconciliation with Scott Russo. Following Youman's return, Derik Envy and Kevin Besignano both left the band, being replaced with Jonny Grill (Russo's younger brother) and Chris Lewis (Fenix TX), respectively.

While performing at Capitol in Perth, Western Australia on 18 May 2014, the band ignored requests to stop playing after the venue's midnight curfew had passed, forcing the venue to cut the power on stage. Frontman Scott Russo and drummer Wade Youman subsequently destroyed a hired DW Collector's Series drum kit.

The band released a compilation album called Acoustic on Cyber Track Records on April 1, 2016.

On June 19, 2019 drummer Wade Youman posted on Facebook that he left the band again and was replaced on drums for four shows by RJ Shankle  and then on January 27, 2020 Behind Crimson Eyes drummer Dan Kerby posted on Instagram that he would be filling in on drums for shows in Australia. Youman returned to the band for a third time in 2021.

The Hum (2022)

The band released their seventh album, The Hum, July 29, 2022 on Cleopatra Records. It was their first album of new material in 11 years.

Band members

Current
Scott Russo – lead vocals, rhythm guitar 
Jonny Grill – bass, backing vocals 
Chris Lewis – lead guitar, backing vocals 
Scotty Mac - rhythm guitar, backing vocals 
Wade Youman – drums 

Touring
Ed Murphy - drums 
Michael Land - drums 
RJ Shankle  - drums 
Dan Kerby   - drums 

Former
Jeff Brehm – bass 
John Bell – bass 
Rob Brewer – rhythm guitar, backing vocals 
Steve Morris – lead guitar, backing vocals 
Pat "PK" Kim – bass, backing vocals 
Tony Palermo – drums 
Dylan Howard – drums  
Kevin Besignano – lead guitar, backing vocals 
Derik Envy – bass, backing vocals 
Ace Von Johnson – lead guitar, backing vocals

Timeline

Discography

Studio albums
Blue Room (1994)
Oz Factor (1996)
Unwritten Law (1998)
Elva (2002)
Here's to the Mourning (2005)
Swan (2011)
The Hum (2022)

References

External links

American punk rock groups
Epic Records artists
Interscope Records artists
Musical groups established in 1990
Musical groups from San Diego
Musical quintets
Pop punk groups from California
Skate punk groups
Suburban Noize Records artists